The 103rd Infantry Regiment was an infantry regiment of the United States Army that served in combat in the American Civil War, World War I, and World War II.  It was an Army National Guard regiment from the states making up New England, but most of its soldiers came from Maine.  It was a part of the 26th Infantry Division and the 43rd Infantry Division.  The 103rd regiment fought in numerous battles before its deactivation after the Second World War.

History

American Civil War
The 103rd Infantry Regiment was originally formed in 1861 as the 2nd Maine Volunteer Infantry Regiment.  It served in the Union Army and was one of the first US regiments to see combat against the Confederates.  It served in the First Battle of Bull Run, which was the first major battle of the Civil War and a decisive Union defeat.  However, the 2nd Maine was one of the last regiments to retreat from the field.  It served in the Peninsula Campaign and the Second Battle of Bull Run, both were also Union defeats.  At the Battle of Antietam on 17 September 1862, the 2nd Maine experienced its first victory, but this was to be short lived.  At the later Battle of Fredericksburg, the 2nd Maine would suffer its highest casualties of the war.  The regiment was also present for the Union defeat at the Battle of Chancellorsville, and were mustered out of service one month later.  Most of the soldiers had enlisted for two years, but those who'd enlisted for three were sent to the 20th Maine Volunteer Infantry Regiment to finish their wartime service.

World War I
The 2nd Maine was recalled into Federal Service on 18 June 1916, and served along the Mexico–United States border in Texas to guard against hostile raids.  On 13 April 1917, elements of the 1st New Hampshire Volunteer Infantry were merged into the 2nd Maine to create the 103rd Infantry Regiment.  The new regiment was placed in the 52nd Infantry Brigade (alongside the 104th Infantry Regiment) as part of the 26th Infantry Division, the "Yankee Division."  The regiment served on the Western Front and was one of the first National Guard units in combat during the war.  The 103rd served in the Champagne-Marne campaign where they had their first real taste of fighting, and went on to fight gallantly in the Aisne-Marne.  The bloodied New Englanders continued the fight at the Battle of Saint-Mihiel, and in the momentous Meuse-Argonne Offensive, the largest and bloodiest operation of the war for the American Expeditionary Forces.

World War II
When called into service for World War II, the 103rd became part of the 43rd Infantry Division, the "Winged Victory" Division.  After finishing training at Camp Shelby, Mississippi, they were sent to the Pacific Theater to fight against the Empire of Japan.  They embarked for New Zealand on 1 October 1942, and arrived at Auckland three weeks later.  The first combat operations undertaken by the regiment were in early 1943 on Guadalcanal.  The Japanese had ended all organized resistance but mopping up operations were conducted to root out stubborn stragglers.  The first major action the 103rd Infantry took part in began on 22 June 1943 in the New Georgia Campaign.  The New England infantrymen did battle with the Japanese and the jungle alike, and many men fell to disease.  Here, the soldiers "were soon introduced to the harsh realities of jungle warfare". The battle was tough for the new regiment and they became bogged down in the dense jungle by the savage fighting against the enemy.  The 43rd Division made a westward advance against the Japanese airfield at Munda and covered the southern (coastal) flank of the drive.  The Battle of Munda Point was extremely bloody for the regiment; progress was slow and casualties were high, but eventually the area was captured on 5 August 1943, effectively ending all organized Japanese resistance on the island.  The 103rd saw extensive and bloody combat at New Georgia and was sent to New Guinea to act as a reserve unit during the New Guinea Campaign, where it saw minor action as a supporting element.  In the Philippines, the 103rd Infantry Regiment landed on the island of Luzon on 9 January 1945 and was one of the leading elements during the Battle of Luzon.  As the left wing of the invasion force, they pushed inland, encountering stiff opposition from fanatical Japanese enemies.  The 103rd fought for about a month in the breakout operations from Lingayen, and finally received a week long rest in February.  They were sent back to the front to mount a surprise attack against the Japanese Shimbu Line.  They then moved into the highlands region of the island and engaged the enemy in fighting that was often cave-to-cave.  On 9 May 1945, they secured the Ipo Dam from the enemy, which controlled roughly 30% of Manila's water.  Both the 103rd Infantry and the 152nd Field Artillery Regiment (both from the Maine Army National Guard) received the Philippine Republic Presidential Unit Citation for their daring actions during the Battle of Luzon.  In 1959, the regiment converted from infantry to armored cavalry, becoming the 103d Armored Cavalry Regiment. In 1961, it again changed to the 20th Armor Regiment. In 1967, the 20th Armor converted to the 133rd Engineer Battalion, which now carries the lineage of the 103rd Infantry Regiment.

References

Bibliography

103
103
Infantry regiments of the United States Army in World War II
United States Army regiments of World War I
Military units and formations established in 1861
Military units and formations disestablished in 1863
Military units and formations established in 1916
Military units and formations disestablished in 1945